Lynne Jonell is an American children's books author. She lives in Plymouth, Minnesota.

Her book The Secret of Zoom was chosen by School Library Journal as a best book of 2009, and in 2010, President Barack Obama purchased the book for his daughter.

Bibliography

Picture books
 Mommy Go Away!, Putnam Juvenile, 1997
 I Need a Snake, Putnam Juvenile, 1998
 It’s My Birthday, Too!, Putnam Juvenile, 1999
 Bravemole, Putnam Juvenile, 2000
 Let’s Play Rough!, Putnam Juvenile, 2000
 Mom Pie, Putnam Juvenile, 2001
 When Mommy Was Mad, Putnam Juvenile, 2002

Novels
 Emmy and the Incredible Shrinking Rat, Henry Holt and Co., 2007
 Emmy and the Home for Troubled Girls, Henry Holt and Co., 2008
 The Secret of Zoom, Henry Holt and Co., 2009
 Emmy and the Rats in the Belfry, Henry Holt and Co., 2011
 The Sign of the Cat, Henry Holt and Co., 2015
Time Sight, Henry Holt and Co., 2019

Chapter books
 Hamster Magic, Random House Books for Young Readers, 2010
 Lawn Mower Magic, Random House Books for Young Readers, 2012

References

External links
 Official website

Living people
Date of birth missing (living people)
American children's writers
Year of birth missing (living people)
American women novelists
21st-century American women